Leonte Tismăneanu (born Leonid Tisminetski, or Tisminețki; 1913–1981) was a Romanian communist activist and propagandist.

Born into a Jewish family in Soroca, Bessarabia, Russian Empire (now in Moldova), he joined the Romanian Communist Party (PCR) in the early 1930s. He engaged in illegal communist activities in Bucharest, Galaţi, Brăila and Soroca. Later, he fought as a volunteer in the International Brigades during the Spanish Civil War, losing his right arm at the age of 24. In 1939, Tisminetski left for the Soviet Union, where he became a student of the Moscow State Linguistic University. After the start of Operation Barbarossa, in which Romania took part (see Romania during World War II), he worked with Ana Pauker, Leonte Răutu, and Vasile Luca for the Romanian language branch of Radio Moscow, first as a newsreader, then as a writer.

In 1948, Tisminetski and his family were sent to Soviet-occupied Romania, where he changed his name in 1949 to Leonte Tismăneanu, at the request of the PCR. He was named deputy director of Editura PMR, later Editura Politică, the publishing house of the Communist Party and also held the Chair of Marxism-Leninism at the University of Bucharest.

In 1956, Tismăneanu, alongside Dean Iorgu Iordan and the academics Mihai Novicov, Alexandru Graur, Ion Coteanu, and Radu Florian, took part in a university inquiry into the anti-communist statements of Paul Goma, a university student who later became a noted dissident and writer; led by Iordan and supervised by the Securitate, the investigation culminated in Goma's expulsion from the faculty and subsequent arrest (Tismăneanu and Florian voted in favor of the former, but against the latter).

Between 1958 and 1960, Tismăneanu was investigated for "revisionist-type deviationism" (deviaţionism de tip revizionist), the inquiry ending with him being expelled from the Party in 1960. Allowed to rejoin in 1964, after the death of Gheorghe Gheorghiu-Dej, he subsequently worked as a writer for Editura Meridiane.

He was married to Hermina Marcusohn, herself a Spanish Civil War veteran who had trained as a physician, held a professorship at Bucharest's Medical School, and briefly worked as a party activist. Their son, Vladimir Tismăneanu, is a political scientist, who headed the Presidential Commission for the Study of the Communist Dictatorship in Romania, which presented a report on the crimes of the communist regime in Romania. In an extended polemic with Vladimir Tismăneanu, Goma has indicated his mistrust in the latter's ability to exercise impartial judgment, allegedly calling him "a Bolshevik offspring".

The Final Report of the Presidential Commission lists Leonte Tismăneanu among the group of prominent party activists responsible with indoctrination.

Notes

References
 The final report of the Presidential Commission for the Study of the Communist Dictatorship in Romania
 Andrei Badin, "Nu cred în legenda celor două Securităţi, una bună şi alta rea", interview with Vladimir Tismăneanu in Adevărul, April 10, 2006
 Paul Goma, Despre Vladimir Tismăneanu - şi nu numai - în 11 puncte
 Armand Goşu, "N-am avut de-a face cu Securitatea", interview with Vladimir Tismăneanu in 22, nr. 849, June 2006
 Mihai Rădulescu, Patimile după Paul Goma
Vladimir Tismăneanu,
 "Timbre roşii cu portretul lui Lenin" in Jurnalul Naţional, September 17, 2005
Stalinism pentru eternitate, Polirom, Iaşi, 2005 

1913 births
1981 deaths
People from Soroca
Moldovan Jews
Romanian communists
Academic staff of the University of Bucharest
Romanian people of the Spanish Civil War
Romanian people of World War II
Romanian expatriates in the Soviet Union
Romanian amputees
International Brigades personnel
Romanian Jews